Lô is a surname. Notable people with the surname include:

 Cheikh Lô (born 1955), Senegalese musician
 Ismaël Lô (born 1956), Senegalese musician
 Maodo Lô (born 1992), German basketball player

See also
 LO (disambiguation)
 Saint-Lô